El Cuervo or Los Cuervos (plural) may refer to:

El Cuervo, Aragon, a municipality located in the province of Teruel, Aragon, Spain
El Cuervo de Sevilla, a municipality in Seville, Spain
El Cuervo, a town in Santa Ana Maya
El Cuervo, a town 20 miles from Ensenada Ensenada Municipality, Baja California to the SSE
Los Cuervos, a nickname of San Lorenzo de Almagro, an Argentine football club
Los Cuervos Formation, Paleocene geologic formation in Colombia

See also

Cuervo (disambiguation)